Joseph Friedrich Freiherr von Racknitz (1744–1818) was part of the Racknitz family from Steiermark, Germany, a family that originated in 1180 at Castle Perneck.  Residing in Dresden, he worked as the equivalent of a court marshal, and published an often-cited pamphlet about the chess-playing machine The Turk, Ueber den Schachspieler des Herrn von Kempelen, nebst einer Abbildung und Beschreibung seiner Sprachmachine, which attempted to reveal the secret behind the purported automaton using new illustrations as well as personal observations.

Racknitz also had a sizable insect collection.  The collection, which contained over 5000 pieces, is still held at the Sachsen State Museum.

References

 Tom Standage, The Turk: The Life and Times of the Famous Eighteenth-Century Chess-Playing Machine. Walker and Company, New York City, 2002. 
 Gerald M. Levitt, The Turk, Chess Automaton. McFarland and Company Inc. Publishers, Jefferson, North Carolina, 2000.

Barons of Germany
Chess automatons
1744 births
1818 deaths